Jim Creek may refer to:

Jim Creek (Mill Creek), a stream in Missouri
Jim Creek (Boxelder Creek), a stream in South Dakota
Jim Creek (James River), a stream in South Dakota
 Jim Creek near Oso in Washington, and the so-named VLF transmitter Jim Creek Naval Radio Station